Ramesh Aravind is an Indian actor, director, screenwriter and television presenter who predominantly works in Kannada films and television. In a career of over 34 years, Aravind has been appeared in over 140 films including several Tamil-language films. He has won and been nominated for numerous awards, twice-winning Filmfare Awards for Best Actor and Karnataka State Awards for Best Actor and Best Story for his script for Hoomale, as well as Udaya TV and Suvarna TV Awards.

Aravind is the host of the television show Weekend with Ramesh, which has had four successful seasons on Zee Kannada. He also hosted Season 3 of Kannadada Kotyadhipati, the Kannada version of Who Wants to Be a Millionaire. Bruhat Bengaluru Mahanagara Palike (BBMP) appointed Aravind as the awareness ambassador for COVID-19.

Aravind's movies Anuraga Sangama, Karpoorada Gombe, Nammoora Mandara Hoove, Amrutha Varshini, America America (1996), Ulta Palta (1997), O Mallige, Mungarina Minchu and Thutta Mutta completed a 100-day run, consecutively, that year.

In 2022, Aravind was awarded an honorary doctorate degree for his contribution to field of cinema by Rani Channamma University. Also in 2022, he was awarded the Dr. Shivarama Karanth Award for his services as an actor, director and resource person. Aravind directed the comedy film Rama Shama Bhama, and acted in the cult films Apthamitra, Pushpaka Vimana (2017) and Shivaji Surathkal. , he is acting in Shivaji Suratkal 2.

Career

Acting 
Ramesh Aravind has starrred in over 100 Kannada films, and other Tamil, Telugu and Hindi films as the leading man. As of June 2020, he is acting in the lead role in Kannada movies 100 and Bhairadevi.

While studying at engineering college, Ramesh Aravind worked as an emcee at award functions, including an event celebrating the success of the film Sagara Sangamam (1983), where he met his long-term collaborator Kamal Haasan. He then started his television career hosting a show on Kannada television before working on a Kannada-language film titled Mouna Geethe, in which he had a supporting role. Prior to the release of the film, Aravind was approached by director K. Balachander who had been casting the role of Kamal Haasan for a Kannada version of the Tamil film Sollathaan Ninaikkiren (1973). After a brief audition, Balachander selected Aravind after being "impressed with his eyes" and cast him as the playboy character in Sundara Swapnagalu (1986), which released shortly before Mouna Geethe. Balachander then gave Aravind a small role in Punnagai Mannan (1986) as Revathi's ex-lover but his scenes were edited out of the final version. Aravind worked with the same director in the Tamil film Manathil Uruthi Vendum (1987) but Balachander later recommended to Aravind to opt out of the film and work with K. Bhagyaraj instead to make his debut in a leading role. The proposed film was later shelved and Aravind returned to the cast of Manathil Uruthi Vendum, winning critical acclaim for his performance. Balachander introduced Ramesh Aravind into Telugu films through Rudraveena, having been introduced into three film industries by the same director.

Aravind made his breakthrough portraying a student union leader in Vasanth's romantic drama film Keladi Kanmani (1990), whose commercial success meant Aravind moved to Chennai and worked primarily on Tamil and Kannada films until 1996. He earned critical acclaim in Tamil cinema for his portrayal of a love-ridden musician in Balachander's Duet (1994) and for his performance alongside Kamal Haasan in Balu Mahendra's comedy film Sathi Leelavathi (1995). He appeared in several consecutive commercially successful Kannada films, becoming one of the industry's highest-paid actors. Subsequently, he returned to the Bangalore-based film industry to work in Kannada films. In his returns to Tamil films since the mid-1990s, Aravind frequently collaborated with Kamal Haasan on projects including the unreleased Kanden Seethaiyai (1996), Panchathantiram (2002) and Mumbai Xpress (2005). Aravind was also a celebrity talk-radio host on Big FM.

Writing
Ramesh Aravind scripted the film Hoomale in 1998, leading to his career in film directing. Hoomale won Aravind the Best Actor Filmfare Award and the Karnataka State Award. His script for Amrithadhare (2005) won him the Raghvendra Chitravani Award for Best Story.

Aravind's Kannada book "Art of Success" which is a collection of his quotes, became a bestseller. His next book "Preetiyinda Ramesh" was expected to be released in September 2022. Aravind has written and narrated the Kannada audiobook "MasadaMaatu with Ramesh", which is available on Storytel.

Directing
Ramesh Aravind's  directorial debut was Rama Shama Bhama with Kamal Haasan. After this, he directed Sathyavan Savithri and Accident. In 2009, he directed the comedy film Venkata in Sankata, and he directed Nammanna Don in 2012.

When Kamal Haasan asked Aravind to direct Uttama Villain, Aravind switched from Kannada to exclusively direct Tamil films. Uttama Villain is the first Aravind-directed film in which he did not portray a leading role; he said he accepted the film due to the "challenging nature of the script" and the opportunity to direct his mentor K. Balachander.

Public speaking 
Ramesh Aravind is also known for his work as a motivational speaker.

Television
Ramesh Aravind has hosted the following shows:

As Host

As producer

Filmography

Awards
Ramesh Aravind has won awards for his acting, directing and writing. He was awarded an honorary doctorate degree by Rani Channamma University for his contribution to cinema.  In the year 2022, he was awarded the Dr. Shivarama Karanth Award for his work as an actor, director and resource person.

Personal life
Ramesh Aravind was born to P.A. Govindachari and Saroja. He has four siblings. He is married to Archana Aravind, and they have two children.

References

External links

 
 

1964 births
Living people
Male actors in Kannada cinema
Kannada film directors
20th-century Indian male actors
21st-century Indian male actors
Film directors from Bangalore
Indian male screenwriters
Filmfare Awards South winners
Male actors in Telugu cinema
Indian male film actors
Male actors in Tamil cinema
Indian game show hosts
Television personalities from Tamil Nadu
People from Thanjavur district
Male actors from Bangalore
Screenwriters from Bangalore
University Visvesvaraya College of Engineering alumni